Cortney Palm (born February 20, 1987) is an American actress and author known for Zombeavers, The Dark Tapes and Sushi Girl.

Career 
Palm's career began after she was cast in the titular role of Sushi Girl. She played Zoe in Zombeavers, Isabelle in Disappearance and Maria in Steven C. Miller's Silent Night, a loose remake of Charles E. Sellier Jr.’s 1984 classic Silent Night, Deadly Night. Her role in Death House was cast on short notice. In 2021, she starred in Beyond Paranormal.

Personal life 
Palm was born on February 20, 1987, in Castle Rock, Colorado. She moved to California at the age of 18 to study theater at California Lutheran University.

Filmography

References

External links 
 
 

Living people
Place of birth missing (living people)
1987 births
Actresses from Colorado
21st-century American women
American film actresses
People from Castle Rock, Colorado
American voice actresses
American stage actresses
California Lutheran University alumni